Francesco "Cesco" Baseggio (1897–1971) was an Italian stage, film and television actor. He was born in Venice, and was identified with Venetian roles during his film career. He appeared in a mixture of serious, dramatic films, as well as comedies such as The Brambilla Family Go on Holiday (1941). On the stage he frequently appeared in plays by Carlo Goldoni.

Selected filmography 
 The Black Corsair (1937)
 Giuseppe Verdi (1938)
 The Widow (1939)
 The Carnival of Venice (1939)
 The Brambilla Family Go on Holiday (1941)
 Annabella's Adventure (1943)
 Men of the Mountain (1943)
 Measure for Measure (1943)
 The Ten Commandments (1945)
 The White Line (1950)
 The Merry Widower (1950)
 I Chose Love (1953)
 The Barber of Seville (1955)
 The Intruder (1956)
 Kean: Genius or Scoundrel (1956)

References

Bibliography 
 Brunetta, Gian Piero. The History of Italian Cinema: A Guide to Italian Film from Its Origins to the Twenty-first Century. Princeton University Press, 2009.

External links 
 

1897 births
1971 deaths
Italian male film actors
Italian male television actors
Italian male stage actors
Actors from Venice
20th-century Italian male actors